City Mall may refer to:
 City Mall (Central America), three malls operated by Lady Lee in Costa Rica and Honduras
 City Mall, Christchurch, a mall in Christchurch, New Zealand
 City Mall, Jordan, a mall in Amman
 City Mall, Lagos, a mall in Lagos Island, Nigeria
 City Mall, Romania, a mall in Bucharest
 CityMall (Philippines), a chain of malls in the Philippines
 Kumasi City Mall, a mall in Kumasi, Ghana